Amoy Brown (born 31 August 1996) was a Jamaican professional footballer.

Career
Brown was on a tear for St. George's College in Jamaica in 2014, where he took home the Golden Boot in the Jamaican competition.

On 28 January 2016, Brown signed with United Soccer League side Bethlehem Steel FC. He made his professional debut on 25 March 2016 as an injury time substitute during a 1–0 win over FC Montreal. Brown was released by Bethlehem Steel on 2 November 2017.

On 6 February 2019, Brown was loaned out from St. Andrews FC to SC Austria Lustenau for the rest of the season. The deal was later extended until 30 June 2020.

References

External links 

Union profile

1996 births
Living people
Jamaican footballers
Jamaican expatriate footballers
Philadelphia Union II players
St. Andrews F.C. players
SC Austria Lustenau players
USL Championship players
Maltese Premier League players
2. Liga (Austria) players
Association football forwards
Expatriate soccer players in the United States
Expatriate footballers in Malta
Expatriate footballers in Austria
Sportspeople from Kingston, Jamaica